Kisan Shankar Kathore (born 19 September 1955) is politician from Ambernath, Thane, in Maharashtra state of India. He was Sarpanch of Sagaon Group Gram Panchayat (Tal-Ambernath) between 1978 and 1992. He also worked as President of Thane Zilla Parishad from 2002 to 2004. He moved from Nationalist Congress Party to Bharatiya Janata Party in October 2014.

He contested 2004 Maharashtra Legislative Assembly election from Ambernath as NCP candidate. He defeated Shiv Sena strong leader & former Labour Minister Sabir Shaikh. After Delimitation of Assembly Constituency of 2008 his Ambernath constituency became reserved for SC. Therefore he contested 2009 Maharashtra Legislative Assembly election from Murbad seat and defeated NCP rebel & four term MLA Gotiram Pawar. In 2014 assembly election he switched to BJP & won again for third term from Murbad.

Positions held
Sarpanch, Sagaon Group Gram Panchayat (1978–1992)
President, Sarpanch Union (1982–1985)
Chairman, Ulhasnagar Taluka Sanjay Gandhi Niradhar Yojana 1982
President, Sarpanch Union Ulhasnagar Taluka
Chairman, Ulhasnagar Panchayat Samiti 1992-97
Member, District Planning and Development Corporation (1995–1997)
Treasurer, Kunbi Samaj Sanghatana, Dist.- Thane (1998–2003)
Chairman, Thane Z.P. Construction Committee
Member, Thane Dist. Dakshata Committee
Member, Legal Help & Advice Committee, Thane District
President, D.E.D.A. Thane District
President, Thane Z.P. 2002
M.L.A. (156 Ambernath Assembly Area 2004–2009)
President, Panchyat Raj Committee 2005-07
President, Assurance Committee 2007-09
M.L.A. (139 Murbad Assembly Area 2009–2014) for 2nd term
Vice President, Konkan Irrigation Development Corporation (2009–2014)
M.L.A. (139 Murbad Assembly Area 2014-2019) for 3rd term
M.L.A. (139 Murbad Assembly Area 2019-) for 4th term

§==References==

People from Thane district
1955 births
Marathi politicians
Members of the Maharashtra Legislative Assembly
Living people
Bharatiya Janata Party politicians from Maharashtra
Politicians from Thane
Nationalist Congress Party politicians